Gérard de Battista is a cinematographer, had a long relationship with the Spanish actress Victoria Abril and they have two sons together, one in 1990 (Martín) and another one in 1992 (Félix).

Partial filmography

Sans peur et sans reproche (1988), directed by Gérard Jugnot
French Twist (1995), directed by Josiane Balasko
Venus Beauty Institute (1998), directed by Tonie Marshall
Un grand cri d'amour (1998), directed by Josiane Balasko
Le Grand Charles (2006), directed by Bernard Stora (TV Mini-Series)
Ashes and Blood (2009), directed by Fanny Ardant
What War May Bring (2010), directed by Claude Lelouch
Thérèse Desqueyroux (2012 film) (2012), directed by Claude Miller

References

External links
 

Living people
Year of birth missing (living people)
French cinematographers